Universal Classic Monsters (also known as Universal Monsters and Universal Studios Monsters) is a home video line based on a series of horror films primarily produced by Universal Pictures from the 1930s to the 1950s. Although not initially conceived as a franchise, the enduring popularity and legacy of the films and the characters featured in them has led the studio to market them under the collective brand name of Universal Studios Monsters. Steve Jones of USA Today described Universal's most famous monsters as "pop culture icons", specifically Dracula, Frankenstein, the Creature from the Black Lagoon, the Mummy, and the Wolf Man.

Merchandising 

After the Universal horror films were syndicated to television, this led to a rise in the popularity of merchandise based on Frankenstein's monster and Dracula. Throughout the 1960s and into the 1970s, the Universal monsters were promoted via merchandizing which included: Halloween costumes, Aurora model kits, paperback novelizations, makeup how-to manuals, T-shirt iron-ons, posters, trading cards, and more. Since 1991, Halloween Horror Nights at Universal Destinations & Experiences have featured characters from the Universal Classic Monsters franchise. From 2006 to 2014, the characters also appeared in the year-round walk-through attraction, Universal's House of Horrors, at Universal Studios Hollywood. The franchise is also the central theme of Universal Orlando's Horror Make-Up Show. The live show opened in 1990 at Universal Studios Florida and is still in operation. Merchandizing of the characters in formats such as clothing and board games has continued into the 21st century.

Home video line
Louis Feola was the head of Worldwide Home Video for Universal Studios and said in 1999 that "a couple of years ago" he decided to "reinvigorate and re-market" Universal's Classic Monsters catalog which included the series Dracula, Frankenstein, The Invisible Man, The Phantom of the Opera, The Wolf Man, and The Mummy. In 1992, in an interview with Billboard, Feola stated that to market and sell home video, the most important thing was the packaging of their sales which was "probably our single biggest priority and has been for a number of years", and that it was key to make the series of films "look like a line".

In 1995, MCA/Universal released a collection of the films on home video under the title The Universal Studios Monsters Classic Collection.
This series included Frankenstein, Dracula, The Mummy, The Invisible Man, and the Creature from the Black Lagoon series. A collection of stamps featuring Universal Classic Monsters were also released in September 1997 titled the "Universal Classic Movie Monsters series". Other characters included in the series included the Mummy, Frankenstein's monster (Boris Karloff), the Phantom of the Opera (Lon Chaney) and the Wolf Man (Lon Chaney Jr.).

Films
The columns show the subsequent home video releases.

References

Sources
 
 
 
 
 
 
 
 
 
 
 
 

Universal Classic Monsters
Home video lines